Thomas Devine (born 11 April 1995) is an Irish hurler who plays as a full-forward for the Waterford senior team.

Born in Dungarvan, County Waterford, Devine first played competitive hurling during his schooling at St. Augustine's College. In 2013 he captained Dungarvan to the All Ireland colleges title, beating Kilkenny CBS. He arrived on the inter-county scene at the age of seventeen when he first linked up with the Waterford minor team before later joining the under-21 side. Devine played midfield in 2013 as Waterford won the All Ireland minor title for the first time since 1948. Three years later, he was part of the same team that captured the county's second All Ireland U-21 title, again beating Galway. He made his senior debut during the 2015 league. Devine has since become a regular member of the team and has won one National Hurling League medal.

At club level Devine is a one-time Munster medallist in the junior grade with Modeligo. In addition to this he has also won one championship medal in the same grade.

Career statistics

Honours

Modeligo
Munster Junior Club Hurling Championship (1): 2014
Waterford Junior Hurling Championship (1): 2014

Waterford
National Hurling League (1): 2015
All-Ireland Minor Hurling Championship (1): 2013

References

1995 births
Living people
Modeligo hurlers
UCC hurlers
Waterford inter-county hurlers